The al-Dumayr offensive  was a military offensive launched in April 2016 by the Islamic State of Iraq and the Levant near the town of al-Dumayr, east of Damascus, Syria. The attack is notable for the abduction of hundreds of cement plant workers by ISIL.

The offensive
On 4 April, ISIL attacked areas around the city of al-Dumayr, northeast of Damascus, resulting in 250–300 cement plant workers being abducted from a factory by ISIL. ISIL reportedly massacred 175 of them afterwards, while 75 escaped. Druze employees were murdered while non-minority Muslims were released.

On 6 April, ISIL launched an attack on the Dumayr Airbase, outside the town, sending five car bombs and killing 12 Syrian soldiers. The attack was repelled by the Syrian Army and the National Defence Forces. Due to a partial ceasefire, the Syrian Armed Forces reportedly allowed some Jaysh al-Islam militants from Ghouta to cross into al-Dumayr in order to fight ISIL. The Syrian Air Force also hit ISIL targets in the front with the rebels.

On 9 April, a new ISIL attack on the airport and power plant was reportedly repelled, after which the airport was declared secured.

On 11 April, a Syrian Air Force plane was shot down by ISIL near the airbase. Two days later, yet another attack on the airbase was repelled, although Army checkpoints outside the base had sustained heavy damage.

On 14 April, the Army launched a counter-attack, quickly recapturing several hilltops, and by the following day, they had retaken control of the Khan Abu Shamat base and the Badia cement plant. On 16 April, the military continued to advance and recaptured the Battalion 559 base, Al-Sini Factory, Al-Safa Station and the triangle Baghdad-Palmyra-Jordan checkpoint, ending the ISIL offensive.

References

Damascus in the Syrian civil war
Military operations of the Syrian civil war in 2016
Massacres of the Syrian civil war perpetrated by ISIL
Military operations of the Syrian civil war involving the Islamic State of Iraq and the Levant
Massacres of the Syrian civil war in 2016
Military operations of the Syrian civil war involving the Syrian government
April 2016 events in Syria